Mint chocolate (or chocolate mint) is a popular type of chocolate, made by adding a mint flavoring, such as peppermint, spearmint, or crème de menthe, to chocolate. Mint chocolate can be found in a wide variety of edible products, such as candy, mints, cookies, mint chocolate chip ice cream, hot chocolate, and others.  In addition, it is marketed in a non-edible form as cosmetics. Depending widely on the ingredients and the process used, mint chocolate can give off a very distinctive mint fragrance. The chocolate component can be milk chocolate, regular dark chocolate, or white chocolate; due to this, mint chocolate has no one specific flavor, and so each chocolate-plus-flavor combination can be unique.

The U.S. National Confectioners Association lists February 19 as "Chocolate Mint Day".

Products

Mint chocolate
Aero Peppermint
Andes Chocolate Mints
Frango Mints
Hershey's Mint Chocolate Chips
Laura Secord French Mint
Lindt Mint Intense

Mint patties with chocolate
After Eight mints
Fry's Peppermint Cream
Haviland Thin Mints
Hershey's York Peppermint Patties
Junior Mints
Pearson's Chocolate Mint Patties
Andes Chocolate Mints

See also

Peppermint

References

Chocolate